Otto: The Autobiography of a Teddy Bear is a tale for children of the Holocaust and its aftermath as witnessed by the teddy bear. It was written and illustrated by Tomi Ungerer. The picture book describes the horrors of World War II and the Holocaust in a profound manner.  It was originally published in German in 1999.

References

Books about the Holocaust
1999 children's books
Children's history books
German children's literature
Books about bears

fr:Otto, autobiographie d'un ours en peluche